The Northeast Bradford School District is small, rural public school district located in Rome, Pennsylvania, in the hills of northeast Bradford County. The Northeast Bradford School District operates the Northeast Bradford Jr/Sr High School and the Northeast Bradford Elementary School. According to 2004 local census data, it served a resident population of 5,223. In 2009, the district residents’ per capita income was $16,169, while the median family income was $41,580. In the Commonwealth, the median family income was $49,501 and the United States median family income was $49,445, in 2010. Northeast Bradford uses BLaST Intermediate Unit #17 for various student and professional services.

Extracurriculars
The district offers a variety of clubs, activities and sports.

Sports at Northeast Bradford
Northeast Bradford has a well-developed sports program with Varsity sports, including:
Boys Soccer 
Girls Soccer
Golf
Boys Cross Country
Girls Cross Country
Girls Volleyball
Boys Basketball
Girls Basketball
Wrestling
Varsity Cheer Leading for both Basketball and Wrestling.
Track & Field
Baseball
Softball
Marching Band

The NEB Cross Country team went undefeated in the Northern Tier League for 4 years, spanning from 2001 to 2005
The NEB Boys Cross Country team won the 2012 PIAA single A team championship at Hershey PA.
The NEB Marching Band and Color Guard won first in the 2015-2016 Binghamton parade.

Extracurricular activities 
Northeast Bradford has a quality, but recently limited variety of extracurricular activities other than sports for students to choose from.
Student Government Association
National Honor Society
Students Against Destructive Decisions (S.A.D.D.)
Concert Band
Jazz Band
Future Farmers of America
 Friends of Rachel (F.O.R)
 Friends of Coy (F.O.C)

The Marching Band 
The Northeast Marching Band has performed in many parades over the years and have won many of awards including first place at the Binghamton Parade. They have also performed in the Calvacade of Bands.

References

School districts established in 1959
School districts in Bradford County, Pennsylvania
1959 establishments in Pennsylvania